Château-Thierry is a railway station serving Château-Thierry, Aisne department, northern France. It is situated on the Paris–Strasbourg railway between Paris-Est and Épernay.

Gallery

See also 

 List of SNCF stations in Hauts-de-France

References

External links

 

Railway stations in Aisne
Railway stations in France opened in 1849